St. Mark Church Monastery also known as St. Mark's Monastery  is a Serbian Orthodox Church monastery located in Sheffield, Ohio, now under the omophor of Bishop Irinej Dobrijević of the Serbian Orthodox Eparchy of Eastern America. The monastery church was initially modelled after the medieval Marko's Monastery in Skoplje in Northern Macedonia. Located just west of the monastery church is the St. Mark Church Cemetery.
The patronal feast day of the monastery is 8 May (Julian calendar).

St. Mark Serbian Orthodox Monastery is listed as one of the important American Orthodox monasteries. In 1985, a youth Camp opened at St. Mark Church Monastery at 1434 Lake Breeze Road in Sheffield, Ohio, which still continues with summer and winter activities.

See also
 List of Serbian Orthodox monasteries
 St. Sava Serbian Orthodox Monastery, located at the Episcopal headquarters of the Serbian Orthodox Eparchy of Eastern America, Libertyville, Illinois
 New Gračanica Monastery, located at the Episcopal headquarters of the Serbian Orthodox Eparchy of New Gračanica and Midwestern America, Third Lake, Illinois
 Episcopal headquarters of the Serbian Orthodox Eparchy of Western America, located at Saint Steven's Serbian Orthodox Cathedral, Alhambra, California
 Holy Transfiguration Serbian Orthodox Monastery, Milton, Ontario, Canada
 Episcopal headquarters of the Serbian Orthodox Eparchy of Buenos Aires and South America, Buenos Aires, Argentina
 Monastery of St. Paisius, Safford
 St. Pachomious Monastery
 St. Archangel Michael Skete
 Saint Herman of Alaska Monastery
 St. Nilus Island Skete

References 

Serbian Orthodox Church in the United States
Serbian Orthodox monasteries in the United States
Buildings and structures in Lorain County, Ohio